Avenida de las Camelias is a military march of Argentine infantry composed in 1915 by the Captain of the Symphonic Band of the 6th Division of the Argentine Army Pedro Maranesi. It is totally instrumental and is usually played with bass drums and trumpets. Due to its vigorous rhythm, it has become one of the main marches of the Argentine Armed Forces and is currently performed in parades and ceremonies by them. The Band of the Artillery Group 1 Brigadier General Iriarte, interpreting the march.

History 
In 1915, in the place called "Campo del Durazno" located in Rosario de la Frontera (Salta Province), the 5th Army Division was performing military maneuvers when they had the need to open a street, to which they called "Avenida de las Camelias", probably because of the flower called "Camellia". This fact inspired the leader of the symphonic band of that division, Pedro Maranesi, to compose a march on the patch of a bass drum. As a tribute, he named the newly created street.

The march quickly became popular, since then being sung in numerous parades and internal activities of the force. Its popularity led it to be intoned by the musical bands of the armies of various countries including Germany and Poland, next to the March of San Lorenzo is one of the most popular military marches in the country. It was used profusely between 1976 and 1983 by the self-styled National Reorganization Process military dictatorship that was then running the country.

See also 
 San Lorenzo march

References 

1915 songs
Argentine military marches